H. tricolor  may refer to:
 Hemileuca tricolor, the tricolor buckmoth, a moth species native mainly to the Sonoran Desert of the southwestern United States
 Hestiochora tricolor, a moth species found in the southern half of Australia
 Heterixalus tricolor, a frog species endemic to Madagascar
 Holacanthus tricolor, the rock beauty, a marine angelfish species
 Hypselodoris tricolor, a colourful sea slug species

See also
 Tricolor (disambiguation)